The news agency Kosova Press was established on January 4, 1999. Since that time, it has published information in these languages: Albanian, English, German and French. It currently publishes in Albanian and English. 

Along the provisional stage under the international protectorate, and due to the current political status of Kosovo, Kosova Press transformed into an independent news agency. Today it has the status of an independent and free media house. It has mutual cooperation relations with many news agencies from the region, and a network of correspondents. It is member of SEEMO, ABNA and a member and one of the establishers of the Association of the Private News Agencies.

Services
The new site offers sections on economy, sport, theatre, culture, art and the photo service.

Articles include the latest from Kosovo, themes about events in and about Kosovo, interviews, news from culture, and different diplomatic activities in and about Kosovo. 

The site's photo gallery includes photos from everyday life and major events in the country, and a limited number of photos from the archive.

Notes

News agencies based in Kosovo
Photo agencies